Now Deh Garrison ( – Pādegān Neẓāmī Now Deh) is a village and garrison in Khormarud-e Jonubi Rural District, Cheshmeh Saran District, Azadshahr County, Golestan Province, Iran. At the 2006 census, its population was 98, in 21 families.

References 

Populated places in Azadshahr County